The Arunachal Pradesh women's football team is an Indian women's football team representing Arunachal Pradesh in the Senior Women's National Football Championship. Their best performance at the Senior Women's National Football Championship was the quarter-final appearance at the 2019–20 edition.

Arunachal Pradesh's sub-junior team were the runners-up of the National Sub-Junior Girls’ Football tournament 2019–20 held at Cuttack.

Honours
 Sub–Junior Girl's National Football Championship
 Runners-up (1): 2019–20

References

Football in Arunachal Pradesh
Women's football teams in India